The Utrecht Marathon is an annual marathon competition which takes place in Utrecht, the Netherlands, usually in April.  It was first held in 1978.  In addition to the main marathon competition, the day's events include a half marathon, 10 km, and 1.5 km races.

The marathon race records are 2:09:41 for men (set by William Kipchumba Kwambai in 2009) and 2:33:40 for women (set by Anne van Schuppen at the 1992 edition).

History 

First held in 1978 as the U N Marathon, the event featured a  full marathon competition and also a   half marathon race. It attracted a largely domestic field of runners in its first decade and began to attract other European runners in the 1990s. The marathon race was removed from the programme of events between 1999 and 2004, and the city of Utrecht hosted just the half marathon during this period. Another organisation had created the Leidsche Rijn Marathon in 2000, whose course ran through the local area from Vleuten to De Meern. The race organiser groups combined their efforts in 2005, forming the Utrecht Marathon, and the city of Utrecht once again hosted annual marathon and half marathon races.

The race was formerly named the Jaarbeurs Utrecht Marathon for sponsorship reasons.

The 2013 race was cancelled due to a lack of sponsorship.

The Utrecht Marathon has had a restart under the name of Utrecht Science Park Marathon. Named after the University and Business centre in the east of the city, where the marathon starts and finishes.

The 2020 edition of the race was postponed to 2021 due to the coronavirus pandemic, with registrants having the option of transferring their entry to another runner.

Course 

The current marathon course is within the city and has a clock-wise looped format. The race starts and ends on Croeselaan, which is near Jaarbeurs Utrecht (a large building complex for events and trade fairs). The half marathon follows a shorter version of the marathon course while the 10 km and 5 km events follow a looped route close to the streets of the city centre.

Prize money incentives
In response to the increasing dominance of Kenyan runners in Dutch marathons, Utrecht race organiser Louran van Keulen revised the prize money scheme for the 2011 edition of the event. He offered 100 € as the prize for first place, but a Dutch winner would receive up to 10,000 € in bonus prizes. Utrecht City Council, which subsidised the event, sought a review of whether the move was discriminatory towards foreign athletes and the council's executive for sport remarked that it "does not make the city look great". Van Keulen defended his position by arguing that he wanted to invest in grassroots sport and improve local facilities, with a long-term plan to see Dutch runners challenge Africans at the top level. He had specially selected twenty of the best Dutch male runners to participate in a "Dutch Battle" in Utrecht.

A Nairobi-based businessman, Gert-Jan van Wijk, disapproved of the prize scheme and offered to personally make up the difference for foreign athletes, saying: "I think the Netherlands is afraid of competition, afraid of the unknown, afraid of different cultures. Holland is turning inside herself, instead of becoming stronger by taking up the competition". A combination of the time needed to acquire a visa and lack of foreign invitations to the event meant that the regular Kenyan contingent, including 2008 winner Sammy Chumba, was absent that year. Young Dutchman Michel Butter was the 2011 winner, breaking a four-year Kenyan winning streak. Kenyan John Mutai Kipkorir, having entered the race among the fun runners and led in the latter stages, was the runner-up and received a one-off 4950 € payout from van Wijk for his performance.

Past winners

Marathon

Key:

Note: No marathon was held in Utrecht in 1999 and the 2001 event was cancelled due to an outbreak of foot-and-mouth disease.

Half marathon

References

List of winners
Michiels, Paul & van Hemert, Wim & Loonstra, Klass (2011-04-25). Utrecht Marathon. Association of Road Racing Statisticians. Retrieved on 2011-05-01.

External links
Official website

Marathons in the Netherlands
Recurring sporting events established in 1978
1978 establishments in the Netherlands
Spring (season) events in the Netherlands
Sports competitions in Utrecht (city)